Bed & Breakfast is a 2010 romantic comedy directed by Márcio Garcia and written by Leland Douglas. Produced by B.B. Film Productions and F.J. Productions, the movie was shot in Rio de Janeiro, Brazil and in Los Angeles. The film stars Dean Cain, Juliana Paes, Eric Roberts, John Savage, Bill Engvall, Marcos Pasquim, Rodrigo Lombardi and more.

The story is about Ana Vilanova (Juliana Paes), a saleswoman from a large department store in Rio who discovers she has inherited property in the wine county of California. She could never expect what she would find in Webster, a small country town.

Synopsis 
Jake Sullivan (Dean Cain) is the almost-ex-husband of movie star Amanda Cox (Kimberly Quinn). He owns a little bed and breakfast in the wine county. Ana Vilanova (Juliana Paes) is a Brazilian woman in love with a beach playboy (Marcos Pasquim) and whose brother (Daniel Ávila) is in trouble with the mob. Convinced that she owns the same piece of property on which Jake's B&B is located, Ana heads to California, intent on evicting him, selling the property and helping her brother, but soon realizes that she likes Jake quite a bit more than she likes her beach bum boyfriend.

Cast
 Dean Cain as Jake
 Juliana Paes as Ana
 Bill Engvall as Pete Sullivan
 Julian Stone as Victor
 John Savage as Mr. Harvey
 Julia Duffy as Mrs. Harvey
 Eric Roberts as Mr. Hopewell
 Jamie Anderson as Caroline 
 Meredith Bishop as Celeste 
 Kimberly Dollar as Waiter 
 Murilo Elbas as Thug One 
 Jesse Jake Golden as Girl One 
 Calvin Jung as Mr. Okata 
 Débora Lamm as Gabriela 
 Ted Lange as Judge / Mediator 
 Júnior Lisboa as Thug Two 
 Rodrigo Lombardi as Bartolomeu 
 Lydia Look as Ms. Okata 
 Priscila Marinho as Flavia 
 Zilah Mendoza as Maria 
 Emily Nelson as Hank 
 Marcos Pasquim as Gustavo 
 Kimberly Quinn as Amanda 
 Roseli as Girl Two 
 Luiza Valdetaro as Babita 
 Daniel Ávila as Paulo

External links
 
 

2010 films
2010s English-language films
American romantic comedy films
Films set in California
2010 romantic comedy films
2010 directorial debut films
2010s American films